John Goodall Snetsinger (October 13, 1833 – December 9, 1909) was an Ontario merchant and political figure. He represented Cornwall in the Legislative Assembly of Ontario from 1872 to 1879 and Cornwall and Stormont in the House of Commons of Canada as a Liberal from 1896 to 1900.

He was born in Cornwall Township in Upper Canada in 1833. He owned a gristmill and general store in the town of Moulinette. Snetsinger served as reeve for the township in 1869. He was elected to the Ontario legislature in an 1872 by-election and reelected in 1875. In 1896, he was elected to the federal parliament. He successfully lobbied the federal government for a small railway station on the Grand Trunk Railway line in Moulinette. He died in New York City in 1909 while visiting.

He was the maternal grandfather and a significant presence in the upbringing of travel writer M. Wylie Blanchet.

The town of Moulinette was permanently flooded during the building of the Saint Lawrence Seaway.

References 

Heritage Highlights of Cornwall Township, Historical Society of Cornwall Township (1984)

1833 births
1909 deaths
Members of the House of Commons of Canada from Ontario
Ontario Liberal Party MPPs
Liberal Party of Canada MPs